Dennard may refer to:

People with the surname
 Alfonzo Dennard, a professional American football cornerback, cousin to Darqueze
 Amery Dennard, known as Big Herk, an American rapper
 Brazeal Dennard, an American singer and educator
 Darqueze Dennard, a professional American football cornerback, cousin to Alfonzo
 Kenny Dennard, an American former professional basketball player
 Mark Dennard, a former professional American football center
 Preston Dennard, a former professional American football wide receiver
 Robert H. Dennard, an American electrical engineer and inventor

Places
 Dennard, Arkansas

Other uses
 Dennard scaling, a scaling law based on a 1974 paper co-authored by Robert H. Dennard, above